The Otin River is a river in Osun State, Nigeria.  It is impounded by the Eko-Ende Dam.

Legend

According to Yoruba mythology, the orisha Otin is personified in the Otin River.
She once protected the town of Inisa from invasion by its enemies, and the townspeople now worship her as a result.
Otin was originally from the town of Otan, but came to Inisa to help fight against invasions by its neighbors.

Region

The Otin River crosses the  Odo Otin Local Government Area in the northeast of Osun state, and gives it its name.
Land cover is partly tropical rainforest, but there is also widespread rotational bush farming and cash crops like cocoa, kola and plantain are grown around the settlements.

Course

It is a tributary of the Erinle River.
The Eko-Ende Dam in the Irepodun LGA on the Otin River was impounded in 1973 to form a reservoir with a capacity of 5.5 MCM.
The headworks were designed to supply potable water to the communities of Inisa, Oba, Eko-Ende, Eko-Ajala, Ikirun, Iragbiji and Okuku. When the dam was built it flooded farmlands of the Oba people. As a quid-pro-quo, piped water was supplied to Oba.
Downstream, the Erinle Dam in the Olorunda LGA is an extension of the old Ede Dam on the Erinle River.

References
Citations

Sources

Rivers of Nigeria
Osun State
Rivers of Yorubaland